David "Dave" F. DeVoe (born 1947) has been a Director and Chief Financial Officer of News Corporation since 1990.

DeVoe has also been Senior Executive Vice President of News Corp. since 1996. Among those two, he was formerly a director of Gemstar-TV Guide International and DirecTV; he is no longer a director as of 2008.

References

News Corporation people
Living people
1947 births
American chief financial officers